Berezovka (Kayıñdu-Bel) is a rural locality (a settlement) in Ognyovskoye Rural Settlement of Ust-Koksinsky District, the Altai Republic, Russia. The population was 246 as of 2016. There are 6 streets.

Geography 
Berezovka is located on the left bank of the Katun River, 9 km southwest of Ust-Koksa (the district's administrative centre) by road. Ognyovka is the nearest rural locality.

References 

Rural localities in Ust-Koksinsky District